Paul Krekorian (born March 24, 1960) is an American politician, currently serving as the 26th president of the Los Angeles City Council since October 18, 2022.  A member of the Democratic Party, he has represented the second district on the Los Angeles City Council since 2010. He was previously a member of the California State Assembly, representing the 43rd Assembly district. Krekorian is the first Armenian American to be elected to office in the city of Los Angeles.

Personal life
Krekorian was born in California's San Fernando Valley, as a third-generation San Fernando Valley resident. He is the son of JoAnn, a North Hollywood native, and Erwin Krekorian, a Marine Corps WWII veteran. His father was of Armenian descent and ran a small business on Saticoy Street in Van Nuys. Krekorian completed his primary education entirely within the Los Angeles Unified School District, graduating from Cleveland High School (Los Angeles, California) in Reseda. As the first member of his family to attend college, Krekorian enrolled in the University of Southern California, where he first became active in political causes. He worked with then-Assemblyman Tom Bane, became the campus organizer for Jerry Brown's 1978 gubernatorial campaign and helped lead USC's Democratic student group. After graduating with a B.A. degree in political science from USC, Krekorian went on to earn a J.D. degree from the University of California, Berkeley School of Law. Krekorian became an organizer for Bill Clinton's 1992 presidential campaign and co-chaired the Saxophone Club, the Democratic National Committee's nationwide young professionals group.

Krekorian practiced law, with a focus on business, entertainment, and intellectual-property litigation, at the firms Skadden Arps, Dewey Ballantine and Leopold, Petrich & Smith, and Fisher & Krekorian, where he was a name partner. He served on the board of trustees of the LA County Bar Association, the Board of Trustees of the LA County Law Library and the California State Legislature's Task Force on Court Facilities. In the aftermath of the 1992 Los Angeles riots, Krekorian was counsel to the Webster Commission and was appointed to the Los Angeles City Ethics Commission. Krekorian has been praised for his efforts in preserving women's rights for his pro-bono work in the fight against domestic violence, and a program he developed for at-risk youth, called GenerationNext. Krekorian lives in the San Fernando Valley with his wife Tamar and children Hrag, Andrew, and Lori.

Political career
Krekorian has served the San Fernando Valley for more than two decades, first as a member of the Burbank School Board and then as a California State Assemblymember. He currently serves as a member of the Los Angeles City Council, representing District 2 in the southeast San Fernando Valley. Council District 2 includes the communities of North Hollywood, Studio City, Valley Glen, Valley Village, Toluca Lake, and parts of Sun Valley and Van Nuys.

California State Assembly
In 2006, Krekorian was elected to the 43rd district of the California State Assembly. During his first term in office, Krekorian held one of the best records in the Assembly with the highest number of bills signed into law by any freshman legislator. He was named Assistant Majority Floor Leader of the State Assembly, the third ranking leadership position in the Assembly, by then-Speaker Karen Bass. Krekorian's legislative priorities included making government more accessible and responsive, saving and creating jobs, protecting the environment and increasing public safety. He created the "Government at Your Doorstep" program in response to complaints about speeding, graffiti, and noise pollution in his district. As the state battled to pass a balanced budget in early 2009, Krekorian authored a historic bill to ensure film and TV production in California stays local. His bill was the first successful tax incentive aimed at saving California jobs by addressing runaway production. On-location feature production increased 9.1 percent in the second quarter of 2012, generating 160 production days in Southern California. Krekorian also introduced legislation that restricted plastic pollution in ocean run-off, expanded renewable energy generation for California public utilities and reduced carbon emissions. He worked closely with local police departments to reduce gang violence, along with crime in his district and throughout the state. In his first Assembly term, Krekorian's Weapons and Ammunition Nuisance Abatement Act of 2007 gave apartment owners greater latitude to evict tenants who harbor guns and ammo. That year, Krekorian also introduced and passed a bill to encourage participation with federal authorities to siphon off the state's stock of weapons.

Los Angeles City Council

On December 8, 2009, Krekorian won a seat on the Los Angeles City Council, representing Los Angeles City Council District 2. He is the Chair of the city's powerful Budget and Finance Committee, the Vice Chair of the Housing Committee, and sits on the Energy, Climate Change and Environmental Justice Committee; Trade, Travel and Tourism Committee; Executive Employee Relations Committee; and the Board of Referred Powers. He also serves on the board of the Los Angeles County Metropolitan Transportation Authority (Metro) and Metrolink (Southern California), and sits on the San Fernando Valley Council of Governments, a coalition of leaders advocating for the Valley's two million residents. His campaign officially began on July 10, 2009, when Krekorian officially announced his candidacy to fill the vacant District 2 seat in a special election. The primary was held on September 22, in which Krekorian placed first with 34% of the vote. A runoff was scheduled for December 8 and, aided by support from a number of public safety, environmental, and Democratic groups, including Los Angeles Daily News, the United Firefighters of Los Angeles City, the Los Angeles Chapter of the Sierra Club, and the Democratic Party of the San Fernando Valley, Krekorian soundly defeated Christine Essel with more than 56% of the vote, despite being outspent 2–1 in overall campaign dollars and 13–1 in third-party political committee donations.

Since taking office in January 2010, Krekorian has worked to improve the city's finances, ensure government transparency, preserve open space, and restore confidence in local government. He was overwhelmingly elected to his first full term in 2011 and again in March 2015 and June 2020. In their editorial endorsing his March 2015 campaign, the Los Angeles Times called Krekorian "smart, knowledgeable" and a "voice for fiscal responsibility and responsive government."

In 2012, Krekorian was tapped to lead the Budget and Finance Committee, inheriting the responsibility of overseeing a multi-billion dollar General Fund budget. Since taking the helm, he has taken a "difficult but responsible approach to solving a $220 million deficit and enhancing the city’s solvency."

Krekorian has advocated for expanding rail and bus transit in the Valley, including electrifying and eventually converting the Orange Line (Los Angeles Metro) to light rail, completing the East Valley North-South Transit Corridor and Sepulveda Pass projects, linking the Red Line to the Hollywood Burbank Airport and connecting the San Fernando and San Gabriel Valleys by rail. He has also led the efforts to connect North Hollywood to Pasadena with a Bus Rapid Transit (BRT) line.

On October 18, 2022, Krekorian was elected the president of the Los Angeles City Council following the resignation of former council president Nury Martinez.

Political positions

Armenia and Artsakh 

In response to the 2020 Second Nagorno-Karabakh War, Krekorian introduced a resolution in the Los Angeles City Council, stating that "The savage invasion of Artsakh is a blow against freedom, democracy and self-determination everywhere."

In a joint letter regarding the 2022 blockade of the Republic of Artsakh, addressed to President Joe Biden, Krekorian and Mayor of Los Angeles Karen Bass demanded the following:
 Providing direct U.S. humanitarian assistance to Artsakh, including food and medical supplies
 Making clear to Putin and Aliyev that the United States demands and will act to ensure the safe passage of flights into Artsakh to provide aid
 Assertive U.S. diplomatic engagement to facilitate negotiations between Baku and Stepanakert to guarantee the rights and security of the Armenian population of Artsakh
 Insisting that Russian troops in Artsakh be replaced by international peacekeepers
 Taking tangible action against the regime in Azerbaijan to hold it accountable for its crimes pursuant to Section 907 of the FREEDOM Support Act and the Magnitsky Act.

LGBTQ+ Rights 
At an October 2022 fundraiser brunch for GALAS LGBTQ+ Armenian Society hosted by California State Assemblymember Adrin Nazarian, Krekorian honored the organization with a proclamation.

References

External links 
 Council District 2 Website
 Paul Krekorian on Facebook

|-

1960 births
21st-century American politicians
American people of Armenian descent
Ethnic Armenian politicians
Living people
Presidents of the Los Angeles City Council
Democratic Party members of the California State Assembly
People from Studio City, Los Angeles
People from the San Fernando Valley
UC Berkeley School of Law alumni
University of Southern California alumni